Dora Rosetti (1908–1989) was a medical doctor – specialising in gynaecology, sexual health and disease, and public health – and also a writer. She was born in Alexandria in Egypt in 1908 and died in Athens, Greece in April 1989. She wrote a single book, Her Lover, which was published in Athens in 1929, and again in 2005.

Biographical information

The name 'Dora Rosetti' was the pseudonym of Eleni or Nelli Kaloglopoulou-Bogiatzoglou.

Dora Rosetti/Nelli Kaloglopoulou came to Athens from Alexandria and studied at the Medical School of Athens University. She wrote from an early age, and was an active contributor to the literary journal for talented young persons titled Diaplasis ton Paidon (Cultivating the Young), edited by famous literary critic and writer Grigorios Ksenopoulos. Through this journal, she developed a literary and artistic group of friends and interlocutors. Grigorios Ksenopoulos thought very highly of her writing, as becomes clear from his comments to her and the correspondence published in the journal Diaplasis ton Paidon.

According to the testimony of Dora Rosetti to Eleni Bakopoulou, Rosetti's friends, the poets Giorgos Tsoukalas and G. Simiriotis, had read the texts in her literary diary and appreciated her talent. In conversation with her, they edited the text into a novel and published it, with her agreement: they wrote the final book ending, gave the author the pseudonym ‘Dora Rosetti’ and chose the book title, Her Lover. (In Greek, the book title makes the gender of the two lovers explicit, hence announcing its subject matter).

The book caused a scandal in its time due to its taboo topic of lesbian love between women. It also inadvertently ‘photographed’ the real-life persons behind the two central characters of the novel, and rendered them recognisable to society. Due to careless editing, the book included enough biographical detail for the real life persons to be identifiable behind the fiction. Hence, the author, alone or with her girlfriend, and under the weight of significant social pressure, opprobrium and shame, gathered existing copies from bookstores and destroyed a large proportion.

(Re)discovery and reprint of the book

The book disappeared and was nowhere to be found for decades, until the philologist, academic and researcher Christina Dounia rediscovered it in two private libraries (first, in the Eleutheriadis residence in Petra, Lesvos, and later on in the Kavafy archive, where there is a copy inscribed by the author to the Alexandrian poet). Dounia republished it in 2005, with an accompanying afterword. The real identity of Rosetti when her book was republished was still unknown, and became a matter of feverish speculation among journalists, literary critics, authors and the book-reading public of Greece.

Shedding light on the author 

Soon after the publication of the novel, Eleni Bakopoulou, an intellectual and activist for the rights of women, lesbians and gay men since the 1980s, brought to light and published documents on Rosetti that she had meticulously kept in her drawers for many years.

The narration of Bakopoulou's encounter with the author, and the personal and archival material that Rosetti entrusted to Bakopoulou, were published in two consecutive issues of the literary journal Odos Panos (132, 133). Later on, in 2012, these texts were published as a book titled My Friend Mrs Dora Rosetti, by Odos Panos Publications.

Dora Rosetti was clearly a talented writer, as is manifest from her only book. As she suggests in her testimony to Eleni Bakopoulou, she kept writing throughout her life, by keeping a literary journal. However, the uproar caused by her daring description and the book's narration of a woman's love for another woman, which is the book's main theme, had as a consequence the destruction and total disappearance of the book, as well as the stigmatisation of its author. Her testimony to Bakopoulou suggests that, besides her first book, she was also forced to destroy all of her other writing and potential literary production, and her archive.

The course of a lifetime 

Nelli Kaloglopoulou-Dora Rosetti was 21 years old when her book 'Her Lover' was published. After graduating from university, she worked as a doctor mostly in Greece, but also in Egypt and in Libya. She studied further and specialised in public health. She also completed a PhD in medicine. She married Kostikas Bogiatzoglou (1895–1967), a diaspora Greek from Romania. Outside her profession, she enjoyed mountaineering, cave exploration (together with Anna Petroheilou, a well-known cave-explorer), played tennis and was a classical music lover. From 1961 until her death in 1989, she lived in Athens, in a small apartment at 25 Makedonias Street on the corner of Aharnon avenue.

After her initial writing and publication adventure with Her Lover, Rosetti did not publish anything else. Her work and life came to light partly through the discussions that she had in 1983–84 with the activist and researcher Eleni Bakopoulou, who had sought her out. Bakopoulou carefully kept Rosetti's testimony and her texts in her drawers for many years and waited, as she had promised Rosetti not to publish anything on, or by her as long as she was still alive. After the publication of 'Her Lover' in 2005, Bakopoulou, after making sure that Rosetti had passed away, published in 2006 in Odos Panos Journal (32:2006) the autobiographical testimony that Rosetti gave her, together with her own account of their meeting. She also included in the publication earlier texts that Rosetti had published in Diaplasis ton Paidon, and material from a drawing and poetry journal that Rosetti had given her.

The novel Her Lover 

After a first reprint in 2005, Her Lover had further reprints in 2006, 2011, and in 2013.  The book is written in the first person, and follows and records, in impressionistic style and through diary-style entries, the life and subjective, inner world of university student Dora, her passionate love for another woman, her student circles, hangouts, excursions, trips to the countryside and walks in the streets of Athens. The book was published under the editorial supervision of Christina Dounia, professor of Modern Greek Language and Literature at the University of Crete, who also wrote an afterword to the book. Included in the publication is also Grigorios Ksenopoulos's book review of Her Lover written in 1929, in the literary review journal Nea Estia (Volume 6). The book was translated and published in English, French and Italian in 2017 (titles "The Two Lovers", Les Deux Amantes, Le due Amanti).

References

1908 births
1989 deaths
Greek public health doctors
Egyptian emigrants to Greece